The Poseidon Adventure is an American adventure novel by Paul Gallico, published in 1969. It concerns the capsizing of a luxurious ocean liner, the S.S. Poseidon, due to an undersea earthquake that causes a  wave, and the desperate struggles of a handful of survivors to reach the bottom of the liner's hull before the ship sinks.

Plot
Formerly the RMS Atlantis, the SS Poseidon is a luxury ocean liner from the golden age of travel, converted to a single-class, combination cargo-cruise liner. The ship is on her first North Atlantic crossing under new ownership, celebrated with a month long Christmas voyage from Lisbon to African and South American ports. On December 26, the Poseidon is overturned when it has the misfortune of being directly above the location of an undersea earthquake. The ship capsizes as it falls into the sudden void caused by the quake displacing millions of gallons of seawater.

Starting from the upper deck dining room, preacher Reverend Frank "Buzz" Scott leads a small group of (often unwilling) followers towards the keel of the ship, trying to avoid the rising water level and other such hazards. Those stuck within the dining saloon are unwilling to follow the Reverend, and stay behind.

Those survivors choosing to follow Scott climb a Christmas tree to ascend into the galley area where they meet some stewards and kitchen crew. There is a great debate about whether to try to reach one of the propeller shafts at the stern, or to go forward to the bow. One of the stewards fears the lockers that hold the anchor chains will have flooded, and suggests that they try for the engine room.

After climbing two upside-down stairways, the group comes upon "Broadway", a wide service corridor that runs the length of the ship and connects to the engine room. The posse breaks for a while whilst they look for supplies. Young Robin Shelby ventures off to find the bathroom while Tony "The Beamer" Bates and his girlfriend Pamela find the liquor closet. When the ship's emergency lighting suddenly goes out, a number of crew members panic and stampede; they are trampled, or killed by falling over stairway openings or into a large pit where a boiler tore through several decks of the upturned ship. After the panic, Scott's group goes in search of The Beamer, Pamela, and Robin, who are missing.

New York Police Detective Mike Rogo finds The Beamer passed out, intoxicated, and Pamela refuses to leave him. Robin is nowhere to be found. While searching for her young brother, Susan is raped by a young, terrified crew member named Herbert. Susan talks with Herbert, who is remorseful and ashamed, and grows to like him. But Herbert, realizing the consequences of his actions, panics and runs off and falls to his probable doom. Susan rejoins the group and tells them nothing of what has happened.

After an intense search, they make the painful decision to move on without Robin. At this point his mother, Jane Shelby, breaks down and vents her long-held disgust and hatred for her husband. The Reverend, having found a Turkish oiler, guides the other survivors through Broadway to the stern. They find the corridor to the engine room, which is completely submerged. Belle Rosen, a former W.S.A. champion, swims through the corridor and finds the passage to get them to the other side. Upon their arrival, they find the engine room, or "Hell" as Mr. Martin calls it.

They take time to rest and save the batteries on their recently acquired flashlights. In the darkness Linda Rogo makes a move on the Reverend. After their rest they see the way out—five decks up, on top of a fractured steel wall they name "Mount Poseidon". During the difficult climb, Linda Rogo rebels and attempts to find her own way. She chooses an unstable route and falls to her death, impaled on a piece of sharp steel. An explosion rocks the ship, and Reverend Scott, in an insane rage, denounces God, offers himself as a sacrifice, and commits suicide. Mary Kinsale, an English spinster, screams in grief and claims that they were to be married. Her fellow survivors aren't quite sure what to make of this revelation.

Mr. Martin takes charge of the group and they make their way into a propeller shaft where the steel hull is at its thinnest. The oxygen supply begins to give out, but after much waiting, they are finally found. Belle Rosen has a heart attack and dies before the rescue team can reach her. The rescue team cuts through and the group climb out of the upturned hull. Manny Rosen, however, refuses to leave without Belle's remains, which are lifted out after the others have left. Once outside, the survivors see another, much larger group of survivors being removed from the bow of the ship. Most are still in their dinner clothes, in contrast to Scott's group, who are mostly in underclothing and streaked with oil.

En route to the rescue ships in lifeboats, they see The Beamer and Pamela, who have survived after all. Sailors from a small German tramper try to put a salvage line on the Poseidon. Mike Rogo curses them because of his World War II experiences, and laughs when their efforts fail. The group goes their separate ways—Mary Kinsale and Nonnie on a ship back to England; Mike Rogo, Manny Rosen, Hubie Muller back to New York, Martin back to Chicago, Dick, Jane and Susan Shelby back to Michigan; and the Turk back to Turkey. Aboard the American ship, they watch as the Poseidon sinks. Jane Shelby, finally giving up hope, silently grieves the loss of her son.

The novel ends with Susan dreaming of going to Hull in England to visit the parents of Herbert. She hopes that she might be pregnant with his child so he would have a legacy.

Characters
 Frank "Buzz" Scott – reverend and former Princeton all-star athlete.
 Mike Rogo – NYPD detective
 Linda Rogo – washed-up Broadway actress; she has destructive persona and is Mike Rogo's wife.
 Emmanuel "Manny" Rosen – retired delicatessen owner and old acquaintance of Rogo.
 Belle Rosen – former W.S.A. swim champion and Manny Rosen's wife.
 Mary Kinsale – head bookkeeper of the Camberley branch of Browne's Bank in England.
 Richard "Dick" Shelby – Vice President Cranborne Motors of Detroit, MI
 Jane Shelby – homemaker and Richard's Shelby's wife.
 Susan Shelby – 17-year-old high school student
 Robin Shelby – 10-year-old elementary school student
 Hubert "Hubie" Muller – wealthy playboy socialite
 Nona "Nonnie" Parry – chorus dancer for the ship's can-can group "The Gresham Girls".
 James Martin – proprietor, Elite Haberdashery in Evanston, IL
 Tony "The Beamer" Bates – partner in a stockbroking firm and raging alcoholic.
 Pamela Reid – an unemployed woman who is infatuated with "The Beamer".
 Kemal – Turkish engine room oiler
 Acre – steward
 Dr. Caravello – ship's doctor
 Marco – Caravello's orderly
 Herbert – young seaman from Hull.
 Mr. Kyrenos – third engineer
 Mrs. Wilma Lewis – widow, having a meaningless love affair with James Martin.
 Marie – ship's hairdresser
 Pappas – seaman
 Peters – steward
 Williams – steward
 Commander Thorpe – skipper of the USS Monroe
 Lieutenant Worden – Navy doctor
 Harper – Thorpe's radioman

Film adaptations
The book has been adapted into two feature films and one television film:
 The Poseidon Adventure (1972)
 The Poseidon Adventure (2005)
 Poseidon (2006)

Notes

External links
 Bookgasm book review, retrieved 6 May 2020

1969 American novels
American thriller novels
Novels by Paul Gallico
American adventure novels adapted into films
American novels adapted into television shows
Coward-McCann books
Nautical novels